Montenegrin National Army was an army whose supreme commander was Montenegrin collaborationist politician and separatist Sekula Drljević. When Pavle Đurišić retreated with his forces from Montenegro toward Slovenia in 1945, he made a safe-conduct agreement with Drljević. According to this contract Đurišićs forces were aligned with Drljević as the "Montenegrin National Army" with Đurišić retaining operational command, based on instructions of Drljević.

Background 
Montenegrin National Army was result of attempts of Sekula Drljević to create an army consisting of Montenegrins who live outside Montenegro.

Establishment and actions 
On 22 March 1945 Pavle Đurišić signed an agreement with Drljević. According to this agreement the Chetnik 8th Montenegrin Army was agreed to be under Drljevićs supreme command as Montenegrin National Army. On 17 April 1945, after he returned to Zagreb, Drljević issued a proclamation with his political program and invited his "army" to fight both new Yugoslavia and Chetniks of Draža Mihailović.

References 

Military units and formations of Yugoslavia in World War II